Commodore  (abbreviated as CDRE or CDREPN) is a one-star commissioned armed officer rank in the Pakistan Navy, coast guards, and marines. It is the fourth-highest rank in Pakistan armed services with a NATO code of OF-6, it is worn on epaulettes with a one-star insignia, it ranks above OF-5 rank Captain and below two-star rank Rear Admiral. Commodore is equivalent to the rank of Brigadier of Pakistan Army and Air Commodore of the Pakistan Air Force.

A Pakistani commodore may be abbreviated as CDREPN to distinguish it from the same ranks offered in other countries, although there is no official abbreviation available for a Pakistani commodore. Commodore rank in the Pakistan Navy is not authorised to have a flag lieutenant as it is not an Admiral rank. Commodore rank is only considered as the most junior of the flag officer rank when commanding senior military appointments, principle staff commands, operational and type commands in Pakistan Navy.

Gallery

References

 

Pakistan Navy ranks
Pakistan Navy
Naval ranks